Schopsdorf is a former municipality in the Jerichower Land district, in Saxony-Anhalt, Germany. It is part of the Verwaltungsgemeinschaft Möckern-Loburg-Fläming. A hammed merger with the town Möckern was repealed by the administrative court in Dessau in August 2011. Since 1 July 2012, it is part of the town Genthin.

References

Former municipalities in Saxony-Anhalt
Jerichower Land